Lisa Maffia (born 16 June 1979) is a British singer-songwriter, musician, rapper, actress, fashion designer, model and presenter, who originally came to the public's attention as the main female member of So Solid Crew. Whilst in So Solid Crew, the singer notched up five top 20 hits, including a platinum-selling single "21 Seconds" and a platinum selling album They Don't Know. As a solo artist, she has released two top 10 singles and an award-winning album including the platinum selling single "All Over". Her most recent release to date, was 2017’s "Wah Gwarn". Maffia is mixed race, born to a half-Italian mother and a Jamaican father. Often referred to as the "Queen of UK Garage", she is credited as one of the most influential acts within the UK Garage music scene.

Biography
Maffia was born in Brixton, London, the daughter of a Jamaican father and Anglo-Italian mother, and raised by the latter, Shirley Maffia. Through her mother, Maffia is a second cousin of actress Louisa Lytton – Maffia's mother Shirley and Lytton's mother Jane Nastri are first cousins Maffia has a daughter, Chelsea, born when she was 18. She trained in Latin, ballroom, tap and modern dancing and practised gymnastics as a child. She attended Norwood School in West Norwood. Maffia then went on to Brixton College to do a diploma in Photography and Art & Design. In 2000, Maffia got her career debut when she added her vocals to the So Solid Crew track, "Oh No".

On 6 August 2001, whilst with So Solid Crew, "21 Seconds" was released. It reached number one in the United Kingdom in August 2001. The single also won Best British Video at the 2002 BRIT Awards. With the success of "21 Seconds", the crew went on to release their debut album They Don't Know which ending up going platinum.

On 21 April 2003, departing from the So Solid Crew, Maffia made her debut at number 2 with "All Over". It spent three weeks in the top 10. She then released "In Love" which reached number 13. This led to the singer releasing her debut solo album, First Lady. Promo for the album included support slots for artists such as Christina Aguilera, Ashanti, Loudbankcoast, Ja Rule, Daniel Bedingfield and Blue. The album failed to reach the success of its singles reaching number 44 in the UK Albums Chart, and led her to leave her record label. Maffia also performed her single "All Over" at the MOBO Awards.
Taking a break from music, Maffia took part in the Channel 4 reality TV show The Games. She earned a silver medal behind Kirsty Gallacher. After The Games, Maffia set up her own independent record label, Maffia Recordz, on which she released her underground single "Shake 4 Daddy" and signed acts such as North Star and Romeo. The label also signed the soundtrack to the film, Rollin with the Nines.

In May 2007, Maffia announced on her official Myspace that she has been recording her upcoming album at the Murlyn Studios, known to have penned songs for Christina Milian, Madonna, Kylie Minogue and others. On 10 September, Maffia released her single "Bad Girl"; whilst the single reached 36 and number 4 in the overall dance charts, the single had success over Europe leading to Maffia doing a European tour. On 20 August 2008, it was announced Maffia would participate in ITV2's CelebAir where cameras followed Maffia and other celebrities as they work as air hostesses. Maffia won CelebAir on 23 October 2008.

Maffia updated via Twitter that she recorded every other week (during January 2009 to August 2009), working with various producers including Roger Sanchez and Bloodshy & Avant and to expect a surprise US star. She also recorded four songs for the comeback album of So Solid Crew including "Since You Went Away", the video of which was shot in June 2009.

In January 2010, Maffia released and toured with So Solid Crew on their single "Since You Went Away". The track reached the top 10 in the independent singles chart, leading to various performances on Big Brother's Big Mouth, Channel 5's Five Live and Radio One's Live Lounge. With the success of the track, it was announced on Maffia's official Twitter that there would be one final album from So Solid Crew, and to also expect more albums from Maffia herself, with her next solo album to be expected in 2012. She also launched her fashion boutique House of Maffia.

In March 2012, Maffia announced her underground single titled "Don't Stop the Music", featuring Maffia Recordz signees MC Romeo and Tyler Daley. Its worldwide premiere was aired on BBC'S 1Xtra on 8 April 2012, and then went on to be released in July 2012. On 22 July, Maffia announced via Twitter she would be teaming up with Aggro Santos on a new track produced by Paul Morrell. Maffia also appeared on Peter Andre's album Angels & Demons on a track titled "X".

In July 2017, Maffia premiered the first single from her new album on BBC's 1Xtra, "Wah Gwarn". Maffia also announced she would be executive producer for UK film Little Lighty, the first film to be produced under Maffia Media (Lisa's production company). In 2019, she presented her own music cooking show on BritAsia TV called Certified.

In December 2021, Maffia announced via Instagram her a new EP will be released in September 2023, and the release of her debut autobiography in 2024.

Awards

2001
MOBO Awards
Best UK Garage Act (with So Solid Crew) – winner
Best UK Newcomer (with So Solid Crew) – winner
Best UK Act (with So Solid Crew) – nominated

2002
Brit Awards
Best British Video (with So Solid Crew) for "21 Seconds" – winner
Best British Newcomer (with So Solid Crew) – nominated
Best British Single (with So Solid Crew) – nominated

MOBO Awards
Best UK Garage Act (with So Solid Crew) – nominated

Dancestar World Dance Music Awards
Best UK Garage Act – winner

2003
MOBO Awards
Best UK Garage Act – winner
Best UK Act – nominated
Best UK Newcomer – nominated

2004
MOBO Awards
Best UK Garage Act (with So Solid Crew) – winner

2018
Black Magic Awards
Music Honour — winner

Concert tours

Filmography

Films
 The Living Dead (2020)
 Time To Collect (2021)
 RoadGirl (2023)

Documentaries
 This Is So Solid (2001)
 25 Years of UK Garage (2022)

Television

Top of the Pops (2001, 2002, 2003)
MOBO Awards (2001, 2002, 2003, 2005, 2013)
BRIT Awards (2002)
Friday Night with Jonathan Ross (2003)
CDUK (2003)
Spring Break Live (2003)
Smile (2003)
The Games (2004)
Never Mind The Buzzcocks (2004, 2008)
Liquid News (2004)
Hell’s Kitchen (2004)
Big Brother’s Big Mouth (2004, 2005)
Deadline (2007)
CelebAir-Winner (2008)
Ant & Dec’s Saturday Night Takeaway (2009)
The Real Hustle (2009)
Celebrity Big Brother’s Big Mouth (2010)
Live From Studio Five (2010)
The Wright Stuff (2010)
Celebrity Juice (2012)
When Television Goes Horribly Wrong (2017)
Certified with Lisa Maffia (2018)
Don’t Hate The Playaz (2018)
Pointless Celebrities (2018, 2019)
Celebrity Coach Trip (2019)-Joint winner with Mutya Buena
The All New Monty: Who Bares Wins (2019)
 Loose Women (2019)
 Trace Vault (2020, 2022)
 Celebrity Hunted (2022)
 Celeb MMA (2022)
 Good Morning Britain (2022)

Modelling
Having modelled for Vogue, Elle and a range of women's and men's magazines, Maffia has also appeared in magazine polls. She ranked No. 91 (2002) in FHM'''s 100 Sexiest Women and ranked No. 77 (2002) in Loaded's Hot 100 Babes. In September 2007, Maffia was voted number 33 in the top 50 sexiest brunettes poll in Nuts magazine.

Business and ventures
In 2012, Lisa founded her own interior design & home staging company, House Of Maffia. 

In 2020, Lisa launched Salon 48, a hair & beauty salon in Margate. The same year she also opened Lyrical UK, a music industry personalised message service featuring artists from the UK Garage scene.

In 2022, Lisa announced via Good Morning Britain the release of Rum Maffia, a line of alcoholic beverages.

Discography
Albums
 First Lady (2003)

Singles

Guest appearances
 Deeper Part 2 - Romeo feat. Lisa Maffia
Released: 2002
 X - Peter Andre feat. Lisa Maffia
Released: 2013
 Walk This Way - Rev Run feat. Lisa Maffia Released: 2014
 Shine - FooR feat. Lisa Maffia
Released: 2018
 Bashdrill Remix'' - Shaqy Dread feat. Lisa Maffia, D-Live, J Kaz, Munie, & Big Zeeks
Released: 2020

References

External links
 Official Lisa Maffia Site
 Official Lisa Maffia Twitter
  Official Lisa Maffia Myspace

1979 births
Living people
21st-century Black British women singers
British contemporary R&B singers
British people of Italian descent
English people of Jamaican descent
Black British women rappers
British hip hop singers
Italian British musicians
So Solid Crew members
UK garage singers
English hip hop musicians
People educated at The Norwood School
People from Brixton
Rappers from London
Singers from London
Epic Records artists
Independiente Records artists
Universal Music Group artists
English Roman Catholics